James Barr may refer to:

 James Barr (moderator) (1789–1861), Moderator of the General Assembly of the Church of Scotland in 1853
James Barr (author) (born 1976), British author who writes mainly on the Middle East
James Barr (biblical scholar) (1924–2006), British Old Testament scholar and philologist
James Barr (composer) (1779–1860), Scottish composer; composed the tune which inspired that which is now used for "Waltzing Matilda"
James Barr (physician) (1849–1938), Irish physician
James Barr (politician) (1862–1949), British Labour Party politician; MP for Motherwell, 1924–1931; Coatbridge, 1935–1945
James Barr (presenter), British radio and television presenter, LGBT+ activist, creator of podcast A Gay and a NonGay
James Clayton Barr (1856–1937), Commodore of the Cunard line
James R. Barr (1884–1910), Scottish engineer and lecturer in Electrical Engineering at Heriot-Watt College, Edinburgh
Jim Barr (born 1948), American baseball player
Anthony James Barr (born 1940), also known as Jim Barr, American software engineer

See also
 James Barr Ames (1846–1910), American law educator
 Mark Barr (James Mark McGinnis Barr, 1871–1950), American electrical engineer
 James Fugaté (1922–1995), American author who used the pseudonym James Barr